Helden may refer to:
 Helden, a former municipality and a town in the Netherlands, now part of Peel en Maas
 Arms and the Man (1958 film) or Helden, a 1958 German film
 Helden (band), a 1980s electronic New Wave band
 Wir sind Helden, a German band sometimes referred to as Helden
 Helden, a village belonging to the town of Attendorn, Germany
 "Helden", the German version of David Bowie's song "Heroes"